The 2017 Women's Oceania Cup was the tenth edition of the women's field hockey tournament. It was held from 11 to 15 October in Stratford.

The tournament served as a qualifier for the 2018 FIH World Cup.

Australia won the tournament for the seventh time, defeating New Zealand 2–0 in the final.

Teams

Results
All times are local (AEDT).

Preliminary round

Pool

Fixtures

Classification

Final

Statistics

Final standings

Goalscorers

References

External links
International Hockey Federation

2017
2017 in women's field hockey
2017 in New Zealand women's sport
International women's field hockey competitions hosted by Australia
October 2017 sports events in Oceania
International sports competitions hosted at Sydney Olympic Park
2010s in Sydney
Oceania Cup